Han Peng (born 13 September 1983) is a Chinese former footballer.

Club career
A product of Shandong Luneng's youth academy, Han Peng made his debut for the club on 10 March 2002 against Sichuan Guancheng. This was followed by his first league goal on 23 March 2002 in a game against Chongqing Lifan. Gradually establishing himself within the Shandong team for several seasons, it wasn't until Han was partnered with Li Jinyu during the 2005 season that he started to show his prolific nature as a striker when he scored seven league goals. This was followed by another ten league goals that helped Shandong win the 2006 league title as well as the Chinese FA Cup. While the next season would see Han have his most productive season when he scored thirteen league goals, he was unable to help Shandong retain the league title. The 2008 season was to personally be a disappointing campaign for Han when he found himself injured throughout most of the season; however, he was still able to help Shandong win the league title.

On 19 December 2015, Han moved to China League One side Beijing Renhe with a two-year contract on a free transfer. He extended his contract with the club on 31 December 2017 after Beijing Renhe promoted to the Chinese Super League.

International career
Han made his international debut on 3 June 2006 in a 4–1 loss against Switzerland. Despite this result, he would quickly become an integral part of Zhu Guanghu's squad that achieved qualification for the 2007 AFC Asian Cup and even scored his first goal against Iraq on 15 November 2006 in a 1–1 draw. During the tournament, Han found himself playing as a lone striker with fellow partner Li Jinyu completely dropped from the squad. While he was able to score two goals within the tournament, he could not help China having a disastrous campaign and getting kicked out of the group stages. Vladimir Petrović was brought in as the new manager for the 2010 FIFA World Cup qualification and he still considered Han as China's best striker. While he played in several games throughout the campaign, he was unable to score in any games as China was unable to qualify for the 2010 FIFA World Cup.

Career statistics

Club
Statistics accurate as of match played 11 November 2018.

International goals

Shandong Luneng

Honours

Club
Shandong Luneng
Chinese Super League: 2006, 2008, 2010
Chinese FA Cup: 2004, 2006, 2014
Chinese Super League Cup: 2004
Chinese FA Super Cup: 2015

Individual
 Chinese FA Cup Top Scorer: 2006

References

External links

Player stats at Sohu.com
Player profile  at Sodasoccer.com

1983 births
Living people
Sportspeople from Jinan
Association football forwards
Chinese footballers
Footballers from Shandong
Footballers at the 2008 Summer Olympics
Olympic footballers of China
Shandong Taishan F.C. players
Beijing Renhe F.C. players
China international footballers
2007 AFC Asian Cup players
Chinese Super League players
China League One players